The Empire was an American automobile manufactured from 1910 until 1919.  Marketed as "the little aristocrat", the Empire 20 was a four-cylinder shaft-driven runabout built in Indianapolis.  The model "A" was a conventional runabout for three passengers with a rumble seat. The model "B" had two bucket seats, a longer hood and was geared higher to attain faster speeds.

More conventional bodywork was later offered; in April 1915 the marque announced production of a 35 hp for 1916.  The company's final products were a four of 3865 cc and a six of 3670 cc.

The business, Empire Motor Car Company, founded in 1909 was a project of Arthur Newby, Carl Fisher, James Allison and shock absorber manufacturer Robert Hassler who built the Indianapolis Motor Speedway in 1909. Their first car was designed by Harry C. Stutz.

From 1912 to 1919, the Greenville Metal Products Co. of Greenville, PA, also produced the Empire. After 1912 4 different models were produced, a five-passenger touring car and four Passenger four-door roadster with 6 cylinder engines. In addition 4 cylinder five-passenger touring cars and two passenger roadsters. A Greenville-made Empire is in the Waugh House, the Greenville Area Historical Society Museum.

References

Defunct motor vehicle manufacturers of the United States
Motor vehicle manufacturers based in Indiana
Defunct companies based in Indiana